Martin Clifford (died 1677) was an English writer and wit, who became headmaster of Charterhouse School.

Life
He was educated at Westminster School, and in 1640 went to Trinity College, Cambridge, taking his bachelor's degree three years later (Cole MS. xlv. f. 265). After the Restoration of 1660 he was a man about town, with support from nobleman and courtiers. He was employed by George Villiers, 2nd Duke of Buckingham, along with Samuel Butler and Thomas Sprat, in producing The Rehearsal.

Clifford further attacked John Dryden, butt of The Rehearsal, in a series of letters; an edition was issued long after the author's death. Dryden made no reply.

In 1671 Clifford was elected master of the Charterhouse, a post which he presumably owed to the influence of Buckingham.  He died on 10 December 1677, and was buried on the 13th in the chancel of St. Margaret's, Westminster.

Works
During the time of his mastership Clifford published anonymously ‘A Treatise of Humane Reason,’ London, 1674, which was reprinted the following year, and again in 1691 with the author's name on the title-page. It was answered the year following its issue by ‘Observations upon a Treatise,’ attributed to the Rev. Edward Stephens, and by ‘Plain-Dealing. … By A. M., a Countrey Gentleman.’ The last-named tract was in turn dealt with by Albertus Warren, who, at the end of his ‘Apology,’ 1680, left description of Clifford's person and habits. To Clifford, Sprat addressed his ‘Life of Cowley.’

References

 Tarantino G. ‘Martin Clifford and “A Treatise of Humane Reason” (1674): A Europe-Wide Debate’, in Philosophy and Religion in Enlightenment Britain: New Case Studies (essays presented to M. A. Stewart), ed. by Ruth Savage (Oxford: Oxford University Press, 2012), pp. 9–28
 Tarantino G., Martin Clifford, 1624-1677. Deismo e tolleranza nell’Inghilterra della Restaurazione, «Studi e testi per la storia della tolleranza in Europa nei secoli XVI-XVIII» 3 (Florence: Olschki, 2000)

Notes

Attribution

Year of birth missing
1677 deaths
English writers